Hans Frede Nielsen (20 May 1943 – 9 January 2021) was a Danish philologist who was Professor Emeritus of Historical Linguistics at the University of Southern Denmark. He specialized in Germanic linguistics and runology.

Biography
Hans Frede Nielsen was born in Bramming, Denmark, on 20. May 1943, the son of Frede Nielsen and Sonja Nielsen. Nielsen studied English and German at the University of Copenhagen from 1963 to 1966. He received a Trinity College Foreign Bursary, which enabled him to earn a BA (1968) and MA in Anglo-Saxon Studies at Cambridge University. Among his teachers at Cambridge were Dennis Howard Green. 

Returning to Denmark, Nielsen worked as a high school teacher for several years. From 1975, Nielsen lectured at the Institute for English at Odense University. He received his PhD in November 1980 with the thesis Old English and the Continental Germanic languages, which has subsequently been published in several editions. In 1999, Nielsen was appointed Professor of Historical Linguistics at the University of Southern Denmark. He retired as Professor Emeritus in September 2006, but continued to teach and research until his death in 2021.

Nielsen was a Member of the Fryske Akademy (1996). He was a co-founder and co-editor of the journal NOWELE, published by John Benjamins Publishing Company.

Selected works
 Old English and the Continental Germanic languages, 1981
 The Germanic languages, 1989
 The Early Runic Language of Scandinavia, 2000

See also
 Winfred P. Lehmann
 Jay Jasanoff

Sources
 
 

1943 births
2021 deaths
Anglo-Saxon studies scholars
Alumni of the University of Cambridge
Danish editors
20th-century Danish non-fiction writers
21st-century Danish non-fiction writers
20th-century Danish philologists
21st-century Danish philologists
Germanic studies scholars
Linguists of Germanic languages
Academic staff of Odense University
Old Norse studies scholars
People from Varde Municipality
Runologists
Scandinavian studies scholars
University of Copenhagen alumni
University of Southern Denmark alumni
Academic staff of the University of Southern Denmark